"Party" is a song by Puerto Rican rapper Bad Bunny featuring Rauw Alejandro, from Bad Bunny's fifth studio album Un Verano Sin Ti (2022). It was originally released on May 6, 2022, by Kagueto's Entertainment alongside the rest of its parent album as the eleventh track before its release as the sixth official single on August 5, 2022. The song was written by Benito Martínez and Raúl Ocasio and its production was held by Tainy, La Paciencia, Jota Rosa, Albert Hype and Richi.

Critical reception
Billboard ranked "Party" the fifth best collaboration song on Un Verano Sin Ti because it "works for so many reasons: an earworm chorus, the refreshing nu-disco undertones, two really fun and experimental artists working together. All elements combined make it a standout on the set. Fun fact: The loop/chorus "party party party party" is sung by singer-songwriter Elena Rose."

Commercial performance
After Un Verano Sin Ti was released, "Party" debuted at number 14 on the US Billboard Hot 100 dated May 21, 2022, becoming the fifth-highest charting track from the album behind the four American top-ten songs "Moscow Mule", "Tití Me Preguntó", "Después de la Playa" and "Me Porto Bonito" which peaked at number 4, 5, 6 and 10, respectively. Additionally, it peaked at number 4 on the US Hot Latin Songs chart as well as peaking at number 8 on the Billboard Global 200.

Audio visualizer
A 360° audio visualizer for the song was uploaded to YouTube on May 6, 2022, along with the other audio visualizer videos of the songs that appeared on Un Verano Sin Ti.

Charts

Weekly charts

Year-end charts

Certifications

References

External links
 

2022 songs
2022 singles
Bad Bunny songs
Rauw Alejandro songs
Songs written by Bad Bunny
Songs written by Rauw Alejandro